This is a list of television broadcasters which provide coverage of the Football Superleague of Kosovo, Kosovan football's top level competition.

International broadcasters

Europe (UEFA)

Current

Previous

References

Kosovo